Buena Vista (Spanish for "Good View") is a census-designated place in Amador County, California. It lies at an elevation of 295 feet (90 m). The community is in ZIP code 95640 and area code 209. The population was 429 at the 2010 census.

History
A post office operated at Buena Vista from 1866 to 1878. It was briefly known as The Corners.

Current situation
Buena Vista is located near 67-acre Miwok Indian rancheria called the Buena Vista Rancheria. The rancheria is administered by the Buena Vista Rancheria of Me-Wuk Indians, a federally recognized tribe, whose tribal chairperson is Pope Rhonda Morningstar.

Demographics

The 2010 United States Census reported that Buena Vista had a population of 429. The racial makeup of Buena Vista was 365 (85.1%) White, 1 (0.2%) African American, 23 (5.4%) Native American, 0 (0.0%) Asian, 0 (0.0%) Pacific Islander, 12 (2.8%) from other races, and 28 (6.5%) from two or more races. Hispanic or Latino of any race were 35 persons (8.2%).

The Census reported that 429 people (100% of the population) lived in households, 0 (0%) lived in non-institutionalized group quarters, and 0 (0%) were institutionalized.

There were 180 households, out of which 61 (33.9%) had children under the age of 18 living in them, 58 (32.2%) were opposite-sex married couples living together, 37 (20.6%) had a female householder with no husband present, 17 (9.4%) had a male householder with no wife present.  There were 19 (10.6%) unmarried opposite-sex partnerships, and 2 (1.1%) same-sex married couples or partnerships. 58 households (32.2%) were made up of individuals, and 21 (11.7%) had someone living alone who was 65 years of age or older. The average household size was 2.38.  There were 112 families (62.2% of all households); the average family size was 2.93.

The population was spread out, with 109 people (25.4%) under the age of 18, 21 people (4.9%) aged 18 to 24, 91 people (21.2%) aged 25 to 44, 139 people (32.4%) aged 45 to 64, and 69 people (16.1%) who were 65 years of age or older.  The median age was 43.2 years. For every 100 females, there were 84.9 males.  For every 100 females age 18 and over, there were 82.9 males.

The homeowner vacancy rate was 8.9%; the rental vacancy rate was 25.8%.  289 people (67.4% of the population) lived in owner-occupied housing units and 140 people (32.6%) lived in rental housing units.

Politics

References

External links

Census-designated places in Amador County, California
Census-designated places in California